The Mayor of the City of Ashland, Kentucky is elected for a four-year term and is not term limited. The mayor presides over City Commission meetings, is a voting member of the City Commission and represents the city at major functions. The current mayor is Matt Perkins.

The City of Ashland operates under a City Manager form of Government. Under this form of government the people of Ashland elect a Mayor and four Commissioners, who together, make up the Board of Commissioners, which possesses the legislative and executive powers of the city. The Mayor, as a member of the board, presides over all meetings, calls special meetings, and executes all bonds, notes, contracts, and written obligations authorized by the board.

The Mayor and four commissioners are elected by the citizens to act as their representatives in all legislative matters. Their primary duties are to enact ordinances and make policies that are for the ultimate good of the community as a whole. The mayor is elected for a four-year term and the Commissioners are elected for two-year terms. In home rule class cities with the City Manager form of government non-partisan elections are mandatory.

List of mayors

Notes and references

Ashland